Avery Island (historically ) is a salt dome best known as the source of Tabasco sauce. A small human population lives on the island. The island is listed on the National Register of Historic Places.

History

The island was named after the Avery family, who settled there in the 1860s, but long before that, Native Americans had found that Avery Island's verdant flora covered a precious natural resource—a massive salt dome. There, Native Americans boiled the Island's briny spring water to extract salt, which they traded to other tribes as far away as central Texas, Arkansas, and Ohio.

According to records maintained prior to 1999 in the Southern Historical Collection at the University of North Carolina at Chapel Hill, Petite Anse Island, renamed Avery Island in the late 19th century, was purchased by John Craig Marsh of New Jersey in 1818. Marsh operated a sugar plantation on the island's fertile soil. His daughter, Sarah Craig Marsh, married Daniel Dudley Avery in 1837, thus uniting the Marsh and Avery families. Daniel Dudley Avery hailed from Baton Rouge, and was a jurist. In 1849, Daniel became co-owner of his in-law's sugar plantation, and in 1855 he became sole owner.

During the American Civil War, a mine of pure rock salt was founded on Avery Island in May 1862, which subsequently produced more than 22 million pounds (10,000 metric tons) of salt for the Confederacy. According to the historian John D. Winters in his The Civil War in Louisiana (1963), the rock salt mine had been well-protected, until Union General Nathaniel P. Banks began a push up Bayou Teche. After an all-night march, Union Colonel W.K. Kimball, in Winters' words, "advanced to the beautiful little island and, without opposition, burned eighteen buildings, smashed the steam engines and mining equipment, scattered six hundred barrels of salt awaiting shipping, and brought away a ton of gunpowder left behind by Confederate Lieutenant-General Taylor's men."

Before the Civil War, Edmund McIlhenny joined the Avery family, by marrying Mary Eliza Avery, daughter of Daniel Dudley Avery and Sarah Marsh Avery.
In 1868, McIlhenny founded McIlhenny Company, and began manufacturing Tabasco brand pepper sauce. In 1870, he received letters patent for his sauce processing formula. That same basic process is still used today.

In 1938, his son, Edward Avery McIlhenny established a nutria farm on Avery Island, Louisiana, near the factory where the company that bears his family name makes Tabasco sauce. According to company history, McIlhenny bought his stock of nutrias from a farm near New Orleans, so he was not the first to introduce the creature, a native of southern Brazil, Argentina, and Chile, to North America. What is certain, though, is that McIlhenny, for reasons unknown, released an unknown but probably large number of nutrias into the wild from the confines of Avery Island, and from there they fanned out and proliferated.

Avery Island was hit hard in September 2005 by Hurricane Rita. According to The New York Times, the family spent $5 million on constructing a -high levee, pumps, and back-up generators to ensure that future hurricanes will not disrupt Tabasco sauce production.

Bird sanctuary

Under the Avery/McIlhenny family's management, Avery Island has remained a natural paradise, inhabited by many animal species, as well as by exotic plants from throughout the world.
Edward Avery McIlhenny, or "Mr. Ned" as he was affectionately known, founded this bird colony—later called Bird City—around 1895 after plume hunters had slaughtered egrets by the thousands to provide feathers for ladies' hats. Edward gathered eight young egrets, raised them in captivity on the island, and released them in the fall to migrate across the Gulf of Mexico. The following spring the birds returned to the island with others of their species, a migration that continues today.

McIlhenny's illustrated and written documentation of plant and animal life on Avery Island was donated to the Louisiana State University library.

Exotic plants
Edward McIlhenny introduced numerous varieties of azaleas, Japanese camellias, Egyptian papyrus sedge, and other rare plants to the Island's natural landscape. When oil was discovered on the Island in 1942, he ensured that production crews bypassed live oak trees and buried pipelines (or painted them green) to preserve the Island's beauty, wildlife, and utility as a wildlife refuge.

Today Jungle Gardens and Bird City are open to the public.

Geography
The island was a sugar plantation formerly known as Petite Anse Island. (Petite Anse means "Little Cove" in Cajun French.) Access to the island is via a toll road (technically a very low toll bridge), though a toll is no longer charged for visitors, including tourists.

Geology
It was created by the upwelling of ancient evaporite (salt) deposits that exist beneath the Mississippi River Delta region. These upwellings are known as "salt domes". Avery Island is one of five salt dome islands that rise above the flat Louisiana Gulf coast. The Five Islands from northwest to southeast are Jefferson Island, Avery Island, Weeks Island, Cote Blanche Island and Belle Isle.

Government and infrastructure
The United States Postal Service operates the Avery Island Post Office.

Education
The Iberia Parish School System operates the public schools in the area. Students attend schools in New Iberia. Students are zoned to Center Street Elementary School, Iberia Middle School, Westgate High School and New Iberia Senior High School.

Avery Island Elementary School (K-6) formerly served the community. After the 2007–2008 school year, students from Avery Island Elementary were moved to Center Street Elementary School. At the time, 118 children attended Avery Island Elementary. While Avery Island Elementary operated, it fed into the same middle and high schools that Center Street feeds into.

Iberia Parish is in the service area of Fletcher Technical Community College and of South Louisiana Community College.

References and notes

External links

 tabasco.com
 Inventory of the Avery Family of Louisiana, 1796–1951, in the Southern Historical Collection, UNC-Chapel Hill. 
 

Acadiana
Unincorporated communities in Iberia Parish, Louisiana
Historic American Engineering Record in Louisiana
Islands of Louisiana
McIlhenny family
Unincorporated communities in Louisiana
Geography of Iberia Parish, Louisiana
Salt domes
Tourist attractions in Iberia Parish, Louisiana
Landforms of Iberia Parish, Louisiana
National Register of Historic Places in Iberia Parish, Louisiana